José Luiz Olaio Neto, commonly known as Zé Olaio, is a former Brazilian basketball player. Netto participated at the 1967 and 1970 FIBA World Championships with the Brazil national basketball team.

References

Year of birth missing (living people)
Living people
Brazilian men's basketball players
1967 FIBA World Championship players
1970 FIBA World Championship players